A constitutional referendum was held in Uruguay on 8 December 1996. The proposals, which included limiting each party to a single presidential candidate, were narrowly approved by voters.

Proposals
The proposals were approved by both houses of the General Assembly on 15 October 1996. They included:
separating national and local elections
limiting each party to one presidential candidate (abolishing sublemas)
introducing a second round run-off for presidential elections
providing for primary elections in parties
decentralising local government

Results

References

1996 referendums
1996 in Uruguay
Referendums in Uruguay
Constitutional referendums in Uruguay
December 1996 events in South America